Ulanqab railway station is a railway station of the Zhangjiakou–Hohhot high-speed railway in Huangqihai, Qahar Right Front Banner, Ulanqab, Inner Mongolia, China. It will be served by Ulanqab–Datong–Yuanping high-speed railway (Jidayuan high-speed railway) in future.

References

Railway stations in Inner Mongolia